Fergus (Holyoake Airfield) Aerodrome  is an aerodrome located  northeast of Fergus, Ontario, Canada.

See also
 List of airports in the Fergus area

References

Registered aerodromes in Ontario